An musée imaginaire or imaginary museum is a collection of works of art that a person holds as essential or favourite, so that given the opportunity he or she would bring them together in a single ideal museum.

The term is closely associated with André Malraux's Musée imaginaire, an essay from 1947 in which the principle it refers to is dramatised. Other personalities have since made their own selection known, such as Michel Butor in Le Musée imaginaire de Michel Butor, published in 2015 and republished in 2019.

More recently, Nicolas Malevé has compared the scale of Malraux's Musée imaginaire to that of datasets for training computer vision, such as ImageNet. As Douglas Crimp noted, Malraux's Musée imaginaire depends upon the existence of photographs. In Malavé's words, Crimp argued that "art history cannot produce a universal plane of comparison without another organising device: photography.

Bibliography

References

Art collections
Anthologies